Abdullah Sallum Abdullah (born 1956) is a Syrian politician, current state minister for People's Assembly Affairs,  former MP and Socialist Unionist Party presidential candidate at the 2021 Syrian presidential election. He studied law at Damascus University.

References 

1956 births
Living people
21st-century Syrian politicians
People from Aleppo Governorate
Damascus University alumni
Government ministers of Syria